The National Film Award for Best Direction is an honour presented annually at India's National Film Awards ceremony by the Directorate of Film Festivals (DFF), an organisation set up by the Indian Ministry of Information and Broadcasting. Since 1967, the award is given by a national panel appointed annually by the DFF to a director for their work within Indian cinema. It is presented by the president of India at a ceremony held in New Delhi.

Including ties and repeat winners, the DFF has presented a total of 53 Best Direction awards to 34 different directors. Although Indian cinema produces films in more than twenty languages, the performances of films that have won awards are of nine languages: Bengali (16 awards), Malayalam (14 awards), Hindi (11 awards), Tamil (4 awards), English and Kannada (3 awards each), Marathi (2 awards), Assamese and Punjabi (1 each).

The first recipient was Satyajit Ray, who was honoured at the 15th National Film Awards for directing the Bengali film Chiriyakhana (1967). Ray is also the most frequent recipient, with six wins. Adoor Gopalakrishnan has won 5 awards, which includes his debut Malayalam film Swayamvaram (1972). Mrinal Sen has been awarded four times. He is also the only recipient to win the award for directing films in two different languages: Bengali and Hindi. At the 19th National Film Awards, Girish Karnad and B.V. Karanth shared the award for co-directing the Kannada film Vamsha Vriksha (1972). The most recent recipient is Sachidanandan K. R., who was honoured at the 68th National Film Awards for directing the Malayalam film Ayyappanum Koshiyum.

Winners

Footnotes

References

External links
 Official Page for Directorate of Film Festivals, India

Direction
Awards for best director